The Highland Line was a  local streetcar route of the Pacific Electric Railway. It ran from the San Bernardino Depot to Highland. A short branch line served the Southern California State Asylum for the Insane and Inebriates at Patton.

History
A franchise for the line's construction was requested by the San Bernardino Valley Traction Company in 1902. Constructed by the San Bernardino, Arrowhead & Waterman Railway in 1903, the line was sold to Pacific Electric the following year. Passenger service to Patton ended in June 1924. By September 1934, the line was only served by a single trip, primarily for use by schoolchildren. This was discontinued on July 20, 1936 with parallel bus routes being in service as a replacement.

References

Pacific Electric routes
Light rail in California
Transportation in San Bernardino County, California
Railway lines opened in 1903
1903 establishments in California
Railway services discontinued in 1936
1936 disestablishments in California
Closed railway lines in the United States